A technical failure is an (unwanted) error of technology based systems.

Causality

Causalities include fatigue and attenuation distortions.

See also
 Absolute probability judgement
 Accident-proneness
 Human reliability
 Human–machine system
 Latent human error
 Order and disorder (physics)
 Sociotechnical system
 Why–because analysis

Security engineering
Error
Reliability engineering
Articles containing video clips